This is a list of castles in Moray.

List

See also
Castles in Scotland
List of castles in Scotland
List of listed buildings in Moray

Notes

References
 Coventry, Martin (2001) The Castles of Scotland, 3rd Ed. Scotland: Goblinshead 
 Coventry, Martin (2010) Castles of the Clans Scotland: Goblinshead 
 Pattullo, Nan (1974) Castles, Houses and Gardens of Scotland Edinburgh: Denburn Press

Moray